South San Jose Hills is an unincorporated community and census-designated place in Los Angeles County, California, United States. The population was 20,551 at the 2010 census, up from 20,218 at the 2000 census.

Description 
South San Jose Hills is an unincorporated, mainly residential community located on the southern end of the San Jose Hills, which forms a part of San Gabriel Valley.

South San Jose Hills is bounded by City of Industry to the south, La Puente to the west, West Covina to the north, and Walnut to the east. The community is easily accessible via the Pomona Freeway (State Route 60), which runs just south of the community. The ZIP code serving the community is 91744. Most addresses do not use South San Jose Hills as the city but rather La Puente, West Covina, or Valinda, depending on the location of the residence or business. Parts of the area are nicknamed Happy Homes, based on the former name of the development and on the street gang that later took that name.

Demographics

2010
At the 2010 census South San Jose Hills had a population of 20,551. The racial makeup of South San Jose Hills was 9,302 (45.3%) White (4.2% Non-Hispanic White), 304 (1.5%) African American, 195 (0.9%) Native American, 1,649 (8.0%) Asian, 30 (0.1%) Pacific Islander, 8,449 (41.1%) from other races, and 622 (3.0%) from two or more races. Hispanic or Latino of any race were 17,713 persons (86.2%).

The census reported that 20,524 people (99.9% of the population) lived in households, 27 (0.1%) lived in non-institutionalized group quarters, and no one was institutionalized.

There were 4,112 households, 2,507 (61.0%) had children under the age of 18 living in them, 2,565 (62.4%) were opposite-sex married couples living together, 730 (17.8%) had a female householder with no husband present, 405 (9.8%) had a male householder with no wife present.  There were 215 (5.2%) unmarried opposite-sex partnerships, and 22 (0.5%) same-sex married couples or partnerships. 285 households (6.9%) were one person and 122 (3.0%) had someone living alone who was 65 or older. The average household size was 4.99.  There were 3,700 families (90.0% of households); the average family size was 4.86.

The age distribution was 6,250 people (30.4%) under the age of 18, 2,596 people (12.6%) aged 18 to 24, 5,791 people (28.2%) aged 25 to 44, 4,274 people (20.8%) aged 45 to 64, and 1,640 people (8.0%) who were 65 or older.  The median age was 29.7 years. For every 100 females, there were 101.4 males.  For every 100 females age 18 and over, there were 98.7 males.

There were 4,239 housing units at an average density of 2,811.2 per square mile, of the occupied units 3,131 (76.1%) were owner-occupied and 981 (23.9%) were rented. The homeowner vacancy rate was 1.0%; the rental vacancy rate was 3.2%.  15,294 people (74.4% of the population) lived in owner-occupied housing units and 5,230 people (25.4%) lived in rental housing units.

According to the 2010 United States Census, South San Jose Hills had a median household income of $50,864, with 16.2% of the population living below the federal poverty line.

2000
At the 2000 census there were 20,218 people, 3,984 households, and 3,605 families in the CDP. The population density was 13,876.4 inhabitants per square mile (5,346.7/km). The racial makeup of the CDP was 38.76% White, 1.86% African American, 1.54% Native American, 6.54% Asian, 0.35% Pacific Islander, 46.35% from other races, and 4.59% from two or more races. Hispanic or Latino of any race were 83.43%.

Of the 3,984 households 53.2% had children under the age of 18 living with them, 67.4% were married couples living together, 14.4% had a female householder with no husband present, and 9.5% were non-families. 6.7% of households were one person and 3.0% were one person aged 65 or older.  The average household size was 5.07 and the average family size was 4.95.

The age distribution was 34.6% under the age of 18, 12.0% from 18 to 24, 30.8% from 25 to 44, 16.7% from 45 to 64, and 5.9% 65 or older.  The median age was 27 years. For every 100 females, there were 100.2 males.  For every 100 females age 18 and over, there were 99.0 males.

The median household income was $48,655 and the median family income  was $46,702. Males had a median income of $26,477 versus $22,113 for females. The per capita income for the CDP was $11,324.  About 13.4% of families and 18.5% of the population were below the poverty line, including 23.7% of those under age 18 and 9.7% of those age 65 or over.

Politics
In the state legislature South San Jose Hills is located in the 24th Senate District, represented by Democrat Gloria Romero, and in the 58th Assembly District, represented by Democrat Charles M. Calderon. Federally, South San Jose Hills is split between 32nd and 39th congressional districts, which are represented by Democrats Grace Napolitano and Gil Cisneros, respectively. At the county level, South San Jose Hills is part of Los Angeles County's first district and is currently represented by Hilda Solis.

References

External links

South San Jose Hills community profile

Communities in the San Gabriel Valley
Census-designated places in Los Angeles County, California
Census-designated places in California